The MTV Europe Music Award for Best Group is one of the original general awards that has been handed out every year since the first annual MTV Europe Music Awards in 1994. Spice Girls, Backstreet Boys, Linkin Park and most recently, BTS have all won the award twice.

Winners and nominees
Winners are listed first and highlighted in bold.

† indicates an MTV Video Music Award for Best Group Video–winning artist.
‡ indicates an MTV Video Music Award for Best Group Video–nominated artist that same year.

1990s

2000s

2010s

2020s

See also 
 MTV Video Music Award for Best Group Video

References

MTV Europe Music Awards
Awards established in 1994